Mette Nørskov Nielsen (born 28 February 1975) is a retired Danish swimmer who won a bronze medal at the 1991 European Aquatics Championships. She also competed at the 1992 and 1996 Summer Olympics in five events; her best achievement was sixth place in the 4 × 100 m freestyle relay in 1992.

References

1975 births
Swimmers at the 1992 Summer Olympics
Swimmers at the 1996 Summer Olympics
Danish female freestyle swimmers
Olympic swimmers of Denmark
Living people
European Aquatics Championships medalists in swimming
People from Esbjerg
Sportspeople from the Region of Southern Denmark